HMS Cheshire (F18), was a ship of the Royal Navy, named after the English county of  Cheshire. Previously a passenger ship, she served as an armed merchant cruiser and troopship in World War II.

She was torpedoed twice by U-boats but survived each and returned to service after extensive repairs.

Cheshire was used as a repatriation ship at war's end in 1945, and was returned to her owner in 1948. She was broken up at Newport in July 1957.

History
HMS Cheshire was launched in 1927 by Fairfield Shipbuilding & Engineering Co Ltd, Govan, Glasgow, 10,552 tons grt. She was completed in July that year for Bibby Brothers & Co, Liverpool as the motor passenger ship Cheshire. On 29 August 1939, she was requisitioned by the Admiralty and converted to the armed merchant cruiser HMS Cheshire (F 18).

A total of 220 crew members were taken off by the Canadian destroyer . Cheshire was towed to Belfast Lough and beached. Later she was taken to Liverpool for repairs lasting six months.

Detonations were heard 2 minutes 27 seconds, 3 minutes 10 seconds, 4 minutes 31 seconds and 4 minutes 37 seconds later, along with the sounds of three ships breaking up. U-214 claimed the sinking of four ships totaling 20,000 grt. In reality one torpedo had damaged Cheshire, another sank Hatarana and two torpedoes sank Balingkar.

On 9 June 1943, she was returned to her owner and used by the Ministry of War Transport as troop transport.

Over 800 men were killed including 763 U.S. soldiers headed for deployment in the Battle of the Bulge.

During Cheshires very next run, delivering the U.S. 289th Engineer Combat Battalion to Le Havre from Southampton between 28 and 31 December 1944, a troop transport in convoy on the same route,  was lost to a possible mine on 28 December.,

Units transported
Units transported during World War II included:
 66th Infantry, 263rd regiment
 83rd Infantry, 329th regiment 
289th Engineer Combat Battalion, departed Southampton, 28 December 1944, on HMS Cheshires next passage following SS Léopoldville sinking, arrived Le Havre, France, 31 December 1944, the same run which saw the sinking of SS Empire Javelin on 28 December.

Post-war
Cheshire was used as a repatriation ship in 1945 and returned to the owner on 5 October 1948. She was broken up at Newport, Wales in July 1957.

References

Bibliography

Royal Navy ship names
World War II Auxiliary cruisers of the Royal Navy
1927 ships